William G. "Billy" Bleakes was a Unionist and Conservative councillor and Assembly member in the Lisburn area.

Bleakes was first elected to Lisburn Borough Council in 1977 as a United Ulster Unionist Party (UUUP) councillor for 'Area B' (equivalent to the current 'Downshire' electoral area.)  With the UUUP in decline, he switched to the Ulster Unionist Party (UUP) and was returned to Lisburn Council in 1981 for that party. In 1982 he contested the North Down Assembly constituency, which then included parts of Lisburn. He won the last seat, just six votes ahead of his nearest challenger, the closest margin of the election. He continued to serve as a UUP local councillor, serving as Mayor of Lisburn in 1988-9 before joining the Conservative Party. He was re-elected as a Conservative councillor in 1993 and 1997.

Bleakes stood unsuccessfully in the 1998 Northern Ireland Assembly election in Lagan Valley. He then left the Conservatives to sit as an independent Unionist. However, a change in electoral legislation meant that he was unable to run under that label in 2001 and he lost his seat standing as an Independent.

References

Members of Lisburn City Council
Mayors of places in Northern Ireland
Northern Ireland MPAs 1982–1986
Independent politicians in Northern Ireland
United Ulster Unionist Party politicians
Ulster Unionist Party councillors
Conservative Party (UK) politicians
Year of birth missing (living people)
Living people